Chamzinsky District (Čaunzabuje; , Čamzinkań ajmak) is an administrative and municipal district (raion), one of the twenty-two in the Republic of Mordovia, Russia. It is located in the east of the republic. Its administrative center is the urban locality (a work settlement) of Chamzinka. As of the 2010 Census, the total population of the district was 31,639, with the population of Chamzinka accounting for 29.9% of that number.

Administrative and municipal status
Within the framework of administrative divisions, Chamzinsky District is one of the twenty-two in the republic. It is divided into two work settlements (administrative divisions with the administrative centers in the work settlements (inhabited localities) of Chamzinka and Komsomolsky) and twelve selsoviets, all of which comprise fifty-one rural localities. As a municipal division, the district is incorporated as Chamzinsky Municipal District. Chamzinka and Komsomolsky Work Settlements are incorporated into two urban settlements, and the twelve selsoviets are incorporated into twelve rural settlements within the municipal district. The work settlement of Chamzinka serves as the administrative center of both the administrative and municipal district.

Notable residents 

Maksim Budnikov (born 1983 in Chamzinska), footballer
Sergius (Chashin) (born 1974 in Komsomolsky), Russian Orthodox bishop

References

Notes

Sources

Districts of Mordovia
 
